Engblom is a surname. Notable people with the surname include:

Annicka Engblom (born 1967), Swedish politician
Brian Engblom (born 1955), Canadian ice hockey player and broadcaster
David Engblom (born 1977), Swedish ice hockey player
Pontus Engblom (born 1991), Swedish footballer
Skip Engblom (born 1948), American entrepreneur

See also
Engblom v. Carey, United States Court of Appeals for the Second Circuit case